Soyuqbulaq (known as Kövüzbulaq until 2015) is a village and municipality in the Jalilabad Rayon of Azerbaijan.

References 

Populated places in Jalilabad District (Azerbaijan)